CJMC-FM is a French-language Canadian radio station located in Sainte-Anne-des-Monts, Quebec.

Owned and operated by Radio du Golfe, it broadcasts on 100.3 MHz with an effective radiated power of 2,510 watts using an omnidirectional antenna (class B). The station has an adult contemporary music format.

The station originally signed on in 1975 at 1490 AM, until it was licensed to move to its current frequency in 1995.

The station shares its website with co-owned CFMV-FM in Chandler.

Rebroadcasters
The station also has the following rebroadcast transmitters:

References

External links
CJMC-FM
 

Jmc
Jmc
Jmc
Radio stations established in 1975
1975 establishments in Quebec